Aleksei Viktorovich Brikov (born 13 June 1978) is a former Russian football player.

Club career
He made his Russian Premier League debut for FC KAMAZ-Chally Naberezhnye Chelny on 25 October 1996 in a game against FC Torpedo-Luzhniki Moscow. That was his only season in the RPL.

References

1978 births
Living people
Russian footballers
FC KAMAZ Naberezhnye Chelny players
Russian Premier League players
Association football midfielders
Sportspeople from Vladimir Oblast